The 1973 World Taekwondo Championships were the 1st edition of the World Taekwondo Championships, and were held in Seoul, South Korea from May 25 to May 27, 1973.

Medal summary

Medal table

Participating nations

References

WTF Medal Winners

External links
WT Official Website

World Championships
World Taekwondo Championships
World Taekwondo Championships
International taekwondo competitions hosted by South Korea
Sport in Seoul
Taekwondo competitions in South Korea